The First National Bank Building was a high-rise building erected in 1909 in Pittsburgh, Pennsylvania. The building was later enlarged to a 26-story,  skyscraper, making it the tallest in the city when the renovations were completed in 1912. Tenants moved in on April 1, 1912, with the building's fireproofing prominently advertised.

Demolition
The Pittsburgh National Bank (Successor to First National Bank/Peoples First National Bank & Trust) decided to build a new building on the site in the late 1960s. Tenants were told to vacate the building by April 30, 1968.

Work began on razing the structure by late 1968.
The structure was completely demolished in 1969 to make way for One PNC Plaza.

See also 
 List of tallest buildings in Pittsburgh
 List of tallest voluntarily demolished buildings

References

Skyscraper office buildings in Pittsburgh
Demolished buildings and structures in Pittsburgh
Bank company headquarters in the United States
Bank buildings in Pennsylvania
Office buildings completed in 1909
Buildings and structures demolished in 1969
Former skyscrapers
1909 establishments in Pennsylvania
1969 disestablishments in Pennsylvania